The Riverside Generating Station is a 261 MW electric generating station operated by Exelon that is located at 4000 Broening Highway in Dundalk, Maryland. The station is on Sollers Point on the Patapsco River.

Plant description
Riverside consists of Unit 4, a natural gas-fired steam electric unit with a nominal capacity of 78 MW, Unit 5, an 85 MW steam generating unit, Unit 6, a 135 MW natural gas and fuel oil-fired gas turbine, and Units 7 and 8, each 25 MW natural gas-fired gas turbines. Water from the Patapsco River is used as the heat sink of the condensers of the steam turbines.

History

The site of the Riverside Generating Station was originally purchased by the Consolidated Gas and Light Company of Baltimore, a predecessor company to Constellation Energy, in 1922 for the location of a manufactured gas facility that was never built. In 1942, the 60 MW steam turbine and boiler Unit 1 was installed at a cost of US$6.5 million. Two additional 60 MW steam electric units, Unit 2 and Unit 3, were placed in service in 1944 and 1948, and Units 4 and 5 entering commercial operation in 1951. Units 1, 2, 3, and 5 were shut down in 1993.

In 2008, authorization was granted to modify and reactivate Unit 5 to operate only on natural gas at an estimated cost of US$25 million. Constellation Energy merged into Exelon in 2012. Exelon announced plans to shut down Unit 4 by mid-2016.

Operations
Exelon normally operates the Riverside Generating Station as a peaking power plant. As the mid-Maryland region is a summer peaking load, the majority of the plant's operating time will be during hot summer days. The Riverside Generating Station is dispatched by the PJM Interconnection regional transmission organization.

See also
List of power stations in Maryland

References

External links
 Exelon - Riverside Generating Station

Energy infrastructure completed in 1942
Energy infrastructure completed in 1944
Energy infrastructure completed in 1948
Energy infrastructure completed in 1951
Buildings and structures in Baltimore County, Maryland
Dundalk, Maryland
Natural gas-fired power stations in Maryland
Exelon
1942 establishments in Maryland